Nation Broadcasting Corporation (NBC) is a Philippine radio and television Broadcast company established in 1963. As of December 2013, NBC is a subsidiary of MediaQuest Holdings, Inc. under the PLDT Beneficial Trust Fund. NBC operates primarily involved in radio and television broadcasting with affiliate by sister network TV5 Network, Inc. and its corporate offices and studios are located at the TV5 Media Center, Reliance cor. Sheridan Sts., Mandaluyong, Metro Manila, Philippines.

History

Radio
NBC was established by Abelardo Yabut, Sr. in 1963, coinciding with the launch of DXYZ, the network's pioneer AM station in Zamboanga City, using a surplus transmitter that he bought from Deeco Electronics in Manila. Throughout the next years, NBC established a string of 10 AM stations in provincial areas. In 1973, Yabut put up DWFM 92.3 in Manila, his first entry to the nation's capital, and the third FM station in the said area. Two years later, in 1975, NBC put up the first FM station in Cebu City, DYNC 101.9; and DXFM 101.9 in Davao City.

In 1987, NBC acquired DWXX 1026 AM from Hypersonic Broadcasting Center and it was reformatted as DZAR, which featured news, commentaries, and well-balanced mix of entertainment and music programming. In 1998, DZAM changed its call letters to DZAR, and reformatted into a news and talk based station.

NBC also pioneered in many ways as the first network to broadcast 24 hours a day outside of Metro Manila (via DYCB 765 in Cebu City). It was the first network to bridge the archipelago with the utilization of satellite broadcasting, and continues to cover the live games of the Philippine Amateur Basketball League and the Philippine Basketball Association (the latter broadcasts this time via the Radyo5 News FM Network). In 1996, NBC has grown to become a nationwide network of AM & FM stations: 16 AM stations and 15 FM stations in 20 cities.

In 1998, NBC became the only FM radio network in the Philippines consisting of member-stations named after their respective markets.

DZAR was the first to launch in 1998 through its nationwide transmission. At that time, DZAR 1026 and other NBC AM stations were rebranded as Angel Radyo. In 2005, The Kingdom of Jesus Christ (KJC) leader Pastor Apollo C. Quiboloy and the Swara Sug Media Corporation acquired all NBC AM stations and rebranded it as Sonshine Radio.

In 1973, DWFM was established as the first FM station during the martial law era. MRS 92.3 was an adult contemporary station, which played listeners' most requested songs. Its provincial stations carried the format as well. When PLDT media subsidiary MediaQuest Holdings, Inc. bought NBC from the consortium led by the Yabut family and real estate magnate Manny Villar in 1998, its stations rebranded into their respective names under the @ Rhythms banner.

DWFM in Manila became Joey and aired a smooth jazz and R&B format. Tony in Zamboanga aired oldies, ranging from the 50s and 60s. Rocky in Iligan aired modern rock. The remaining NBC stations in Baguio (Jesse), Cabanatuan (Donna), San Pablo, Laguna (Lovely), Naga (Nikki), Legazpi (Alex), Bacolod (Jamie), Cebu (Charlie), Davao (Danni), Butuan (Jake), Cagayan de Oro (Sandy), General Santos (Anna) and Cotabato (Marco) aired a contemporary hit radio format. The Rhythms banner was dropped in 2004, leaving their names intact.

On April 8, 1998, Republic Act No. 8623 renewed NBC its congressional franchise for another 25 years, The law granted NBC a franchise to construct, install, establish, operate and maintain for commercial purposes and in the public interest, radio and/or television broadcasting stations in the Philippines.

On April 8, 2007, XFM began after 923 Joey was signed off on April 4, just before Holy week. XFM featured ambient, chill, down-tempo, electronica, house, lounge, trip-hop and indie music on radio until its ground-breaking format in February 2008.

In October 2009, the Manila, Cebu and Davao stations discontinued their Smooth AC format. The Manila station became U92, in partnership with All Youth Channels. It became the first CHR-formatted station focused on MTV Philippines broadcasting from a state-of-the-art studio at Silver City Mall, Frontera Verde Complex, Pasig City. The Cebu and Davao stations became WAV FM, in partnership with AudioWAV (WAV Atmospheric), a Makati City-based multinational instore radio company known for producing customized music and messaging for large chains across Southeast Asia and North America. The other provincial stations retained their formats. On September 30, 2010, U92 shut down following the dissolution of MTV Philippines in February.

On October 1, 2010, NBC, in partnership with its affiliate ABC Development Corporation (TV5), took over the management of 92.3 FM. As part of TV5's expansion, the station will become Radyo5 92.3 News FM, the first news/talk station on FM band. On November 8, it had its debut at 12:30 am and its first day of broadcasting began at 4 am. Beginning February 21, 2011, its provincial stations started carrying Radyo5 programming.

Television
Nation Broadcasting Corporation (NBC-41) is a commercial UHF television station owned by First Pacific conglomerate and headed by Manuel Pangilinan, who is also the chairman of the telecommunications giant Philippine Long Distance Telephone Company (PLDT).

The name was unfamiliar to many Filipinos. NBC TV 41 used to be MTV Philippines. MTV ("Music Television") is a cable TV network which was originally devoted to music videos, especially popular rock music. MTV later became an outlet for a variety of material aimed at adolescents and young adults.

After six years of partnership in the Philippines, MTV Channel 41 has gone off the air after a multi-year deal with All Youth Channel (AYC). This follows the dissolution of the partnership with NBC. MTV Philippines became a defunct channel in February 2010. It was inactive until October 2010 when it began test broadcasting as TV5 and when ABC Development Corporation took over the management of NBC stations. It then took over the blocktime of UHF Channel 41, which alternates programming  ABC Development Corporation. It was simulcast with Radyo5 92.3 News FM for a few months when it debuted on November 8. TV5 was scheduled to set up the first free-to-air interactive-radio-on-TV channel with a format similar to DZMM TeleRadyo and RHTV in the first quarter of 2011. It was set  to broadcast after its initial simulcasting of 92.3 News FM if Associated Broadcasting Company introduced this UHF channel. It plans to initialize test broadcasts on various cable and satellite operators nationwide.

On February 21, 2011, AksyonTV launched as TV5 introduced the new UHF channel. AksyonTV was launched at exactly 4 am, airing its first program, Andar ng Mga Balita, hosted by Martin Andanar (now with Presidential Communications Operations Office), which was a simulcast of the morning news program on Radyo5 News FM of the same title.

After 8 years as news channel (sports content was later added), AksyonTV is announced to be rebranded as 5 Plus on January 13, 2019, with its programs consisting of mostly sports from ESPN5 and serving as a complementary channel for The 5 Network.

On March 8, 2020 (after 14 months as 5 Plus), the channel was relaunched when One Sports took over its channel space, making it available on free TV and other pay television operators. Meanwhile, its original satellite channel counterpart of One Sports was rebranded as One Sports+.

Legislative franchise renewal
On March 29, 2022, Philippine President Rodrigo Duterte signed Republic Act No. 11667 which renewed NBC's legislative franchise for another 25 years. The law granted NBC a franchise to construct, install, operate, and maintain, for commercial purposes, radio broadcasting stations and television stations, including digital television system, with the corresponding facilities such as relay stations, throughout the Philippines.

NBC stations nationwide

References

 
MediaQuest Holdings
Radio stations in the Philippines
Television networks in the Philippines
Television channels and stations established in 1963
Radio stations established in 1963
Companies based in Mandaluyong
Philippine companies established in 1963
Mass media companies established in 1965